Carlos García Pierna (born 23 July 1999) is a Spanish cyclist who currently rides for UCI ProTeam .

Major results
2017
 5th Overall Ain Bugey Valromey Tour
2018
 5th Road race, National Under-23 Road Championships

References

External links

1999 births
Living people
Spanish male cyclists
Cyclists from the Community of Madrid